Comfort Lake is a lake in Chisago County, Minnesota, in the United States.

Comfort Lake was named for Dr. John W. Comfort, a local physician who settled there close to Peterson Point.

.

See also
List of lakes in Minnesota

References

Lakes of Minnesota
Lakes of Chisago County, Minnesota